Sweet Cheeks may refer to:

Music
Sweet Cheeks (band), with Lou Bennett
The Sweet Cheeks, a band that was previously named Crazy 8s 
Sweet Cheeks, 1978 album by Duke Jupiter
"Sweet Cheeks", a song by J Hus from the 2017 album Common Sense

Other
Samantha "Sweet-Cheeks" Smith, a character in the video game Island Peril
Sweet Cheeks, a charity started by snowboarder Hannah Teter
Shaun Cooper (musician), aka Shaun "Sweet Cheeks" William Cooper  
"Sweet Cheeks" Marie, a character in the video game Police Quest
Sweet Cheeks Q, a Texas-style barbecue restaurant in Boston's Fenway District owned by Tiffani Faison